The 2012–13 Los Angeles Kings season was the 46th season (45th season of play) for the National Hockey League (NHL) franchise. The regular season was reduced from its usual 82 games to 48 due to the 2012–13 NHL lockout.

The team's attempt to defend their first Stanley Cup championship in franchise history was ended by the Chicago Blackhawks in the Western Conference Finals.

Off-season

Regular season

January
The King started their season with three losses, their worst season opener since losing five of their first six games in 2007–08. They lost 5–2 in their season opener against the Chicago Blackhawks on January 19, surrendering more goals than in any of the 20 games during their 2012 playoff run. Chicago scored three goals in the first 15 minutes, and the Kings did not score their first until they were trailing 4–0. Matt Greene was placed on the injured reserve list after suffering a back injury in the game that was expected to take him out the rest of the season, a major blow to a Kings' defense already suffering from the loss of Willie Mitchell due to knee surgery. The Kings then began a challenging schedule with 11 of their next 15 games away, starting with a 1–3 loss against the Colorado Avalanche on January 22. Despite a poor start for Colorado, they defeated Los Angeles after a three-goal rally in the third period. Anže Kopitar, who missed the first game due to a knee injury, failed to make a shot in 24 shifts against Colorado, and the Kings failed to score on any of their six power plays. After the loss, Dustin Penner was a healthy scratch for the next four games.

The Kings lost 1–3 to the Edmonton Oilers on January 24, making them one of only three teams in the league without a victory at that point. Los Angeles led 1–0 until the third period, when the Oilers appeared to tie it with 1:05 left after Ryan Nugent-Hopkins scored, but it was overturned after Jonathan Quick successfully argued Edmonton forward Sam Gagner interfered with him in the crease. But Oilers rookie Nail Yakupov forced overtime after scoring with 4.6 seconds left, which led to an Edmonton overtime victory. The Kings won their first game of the season on January 26, beating the Phoenix Coyotes 4–2. Kopitar scored two goals, his first regular season multi-goal game since October 8, 2011 against the Buffalo Sabres. Los Angeles continued to struggle with the power play, failing to capitalize on a 5-on-3 with their first unit on the ice the first 81 seconds.

The Kings won a second victory on January 28, beating the Vancouver Canucks 2–3. Los Angeles had a 2–0 deficit in the second period until Jeff Carter scored seven seconds into a power play advantage. The goal ended a 0-for-25 power play slump for the Kings, but they continued to hold the worst power play record in the league. Slava Voynov scored the game-tying goal with 44 seconds left in the third period to force overtime, where Carter made a third-round shootout goal to win the game. Los Angeles lost their next game on January 31, falling 2–1 in overtime to the Nashville Predators. Dustin Brown scored his first goal of the season, and although the Kings' offense struggled, their defense allowed only 11 shots in regulation and three more in overtime. Nashville goaltender Pekka Rinne stopped five of the Kings' eight shootout attempts before Nashville left wing Sergei Kostitsyn scored in the eighth round for the win.

February
Los Angeles opened the month with a 4–7 loss to the Anaheim Ducks on February 2, marking the second time in the season they allowed five goals in regulation. Quick was pulled from the goal after allowing Anaheim's Nick Bonino to score two goals in six minutes. Brown scored two power play goals for the Kings, who tied the game three times but never led. The Kings followed that loss with a 4–2 victory against the Columbus Blue Jackets, against whom they held without a shot on goal for more than 18 minutes and 28 seconds between the second and third periods. But Los Angeles suffered their first shutout of the season with a 0–3 loss to the Nashville Predators on February 7. The Kings made 32 shots on goal, but managed only four during the third period. Penner was again a healthy scratch. The Kings lost again on February 10 to the Detroit Red Wings despite a season-high 47 shots. Alec Martinez tied the game 2–2 for the Kings with 53 seconds left in the game, but Detroit's Jonathan Ericsson scored the game-winning goal with five seconds left.

Despite the loss, Red Wings coach Mike Babcock felt Los Angeles was the superior team in the third quarter, and Kopitar and Brown both believed it was the team's best game of the season so far. The Detroit game was later described as a turning point for the Kings, who went on to win five of their next six games. They beat the St. Louis Blues 4–1 on February 11, with backup goaltender Jonathan Bernier making 21 saves in his first start with the Kings. Los Angeles matched their season best for goals, and Carter scored twice for the first time since game six of the 2012 Stanley Cup Finals. Martinez, however, suffered an upper body injury in the first period and was placed on injured reserve, joining fellow defencemen Greene and Mitchell. Bernier started again the next game on February 15, when the Kings beat Columbus 2–1 in their first home game after five away. Kyle Clifford scored late in the second period, marking the first Kings lead in four home games, and Richards scored a goal with a two-man advantage in the third to capture his 400th NHL point.

The Kings lost 3–2 to the first-place Blackhawks on February 17. Trailing 3–0 in the third period, Richards scored two power play goals, but Los Angeles failed to tie the game on a six-on-four after pulling Quick from the ice. More than a quarter into the shortened season, the Kings were ranked 29th in the league for goals scored, and several players had no goals including Penner, Doughty, Simon Gagné, Trevor Lewis and Dwight King. The Kings won their next two away games, besting the Oilers 3–1 on February 19 and the Calgary Flames 3–1 on February 20. Colin Fraser, returning to the line-up after being scratched for four games, opened the scoring against Edmonton with his first goal of the season, and Carter broke a 1–1 tie with 49.4 seconds left in the game. Bernier had his third start and win of the season against Calgary, during which Los Angeles took six shots in the first five minutes before Brown scored on the seventh. Calgary scored their sole goal later in the first period, but Lewis regained the lead with a goal 29 seconds later, marking his first point in 13 games.

Finished their schedule of 11 of 15 away games finished, the Kings next began a more favorable schedule with 13 of their next 16 games at home, and 20 of the season's final 33 at home. The Kings beat Colorado 4–1 during their first home game on February 23, with Brown scoring the first goal 58 seconds into the game. Shortly after Colorado scored their only goal, Lewis regained the lead by making the Kings' first short-handed goal of the season. Los Angeles also defeated Anaheim 5–2 on February 26, where Penner tied the game 2–2 in the second period with first goal of the season, which the team followed with three unanswered goals in the third to win. Kopitar had a season-high three assists, and Carter scored an empty netter for his team-leading 10th goal of the season.

Standings

Divisional standings

Conference standings

Schedule and results

Playoffs

The Kings entered the playoffs as the Western Conference's fifth seed. Their quest for back to back Cups was ended by the Chicago Blackhawks in the Western Conference Finals.

Player statistics

Skaters
Note: GP = Games played; G = Goals; A = Assists; Pts = Points; +/− = Plus/minus; PIM = Penalty minutes
Final stats 

†Denotes player spent time with another team before joining the Kings.  Stats reflect time with the Kings only.
‡Traded mid-season
Bold/italics denotes franchise record

Goaltenders
Note: GP = Games played; GS = Games started; TOI = Time on ice; W = Wins; L = Losses; OT = Overtime losses; GA = Goals against; GAA = Goals against average; SV = Saves; SA = Shots against; SV% = Save percentage; SO = Shutouts; G = Goals; A = Assists; PIM = Penalty minutes
Final stats

Milestones

Transactions
The Kings have been involved in the following transactions during the 2012–13 season:

Trades

Free agents signed

Free agents lost

Claimed via waivers

Lost via waivers

Lost via retirement

Player signings

Draft picks 
Los Angeles' selections at the 2012 NHL Entry Draft in Pittsburgh, Pennsylvania. 

Draft notes

 The Kings' second-round pick went to the Philadelphia Flyers as the result of a June 23, 2011, trade that sent Mike Richards and Rob Bordson to the Kings in exchange for Wayne Simmonds, Brayden Schenn this pick.
 The Kings' third-round pick went to the Edmonton Oilers as the result of a February 28, 2011, trade that sent Dustin Penner to the Kings in exchange for Colten Teubert, 2011 first-round pick and this conditional pick (second round if Kings win 2011 Stanley Cup, else third round).
 The Philadelphia Flyers' sixth-round pick went to the Los Angeles Kings as a result of an October 12, 2011, trade that sent future considerations to the Flyers in exchange for Stefan Legein and this pick.
 The Edmonton Oilers' seventh-round pick went to the Dallas Stars (via Los Angeles) as the result of a trade on June 23, 2012, that sent a seventh-round pick in 2013 to Los Angeles in exchange for this pick. Los Angeles had previously acquired this pick as a result of a June 26, 2011 trade that sent Ryan Smyth to the Oilers in exchange for Colin Fraser and this pick.

See also 
 2012–13 NHL season

Notes

References

Los Angeles Kings seasons
Los Angeles Kings season, 2012-13
Los
Los Angeles King
Los Angeles King